Cavour is an Italian aircraft carrier launched in 2004. She is the flagship of the Italian Navy.

Design

The ship is designed to combine fixed-wing V/STOL and helicopter air operations, command and control operations, and the transport of military or civil personnel and heavy vehicles. The ,  hangar space can double as a vehicle hold capable of holding up to 24 main battle tanks (typically Ariete) or many more lighter vehicles (50 Dardo IFV, 100+ Iveco LMV), and is fitted aft with access ramps rated to 70 tons, as well as two elevators rated up to 30 tons for aircraft. Cavour can also operate as landing platform helicopter, accommodating heavy transport helicopters (AgustaWestland UH-101A ASH) and 325 marines (91 more, on option).
The Cavour has a displacement of 27,900 tons but can reach more than 30,000 tons at full military capacity.

The Italian Navy will replace its 16 Harriers with 15 (originally 22) Lockheed Martin F-35B Lightning IIs. By May 2020, the modernization to allow Cavour to support the F-35B was completed, and the carrier was ready for subsequent integration trials. Cavour will have room for ten F-35Bs in the hangar, and six more parked on deck.

Construction
Cavour was laid down by Fincantieri in June 2001, and was launched from the Riva Trigoso shipyard in Sestri Levante, on 20 July 2004. Sea trials began in December 2006, and she was officially commissioned 27 March 2008. Full operational capability (FOC) was reached 10 June 2009.

Service history
On 19 January 2010, Cavour was dispatched to Haiti as part of Operation White Crane, Italy's operation for 2010 Haiti earthquake relief. This was the first mission of the aircraft carrier, where it supplemented international efforts to provide relief for the victims of the 2010 Haiti earthquake.

It is reported that modernization works on the Cavour has been completed. In May 2020, it was announced the Italian aircraft carrier will undertake a preparatory training before sailing to the U.S. where the ship will conduct trials with the F-35B STOVL.

In February 2021, Cavour deployed to the United States for its initial period of flying trials with the F-35B. This saw the ship engage in four weeks of verification to determine the performance envelope of the aircraft when operating from the flight deck, using a pair of aircraft from VX-23, the US Navy's Test and Evaluation Squadron. Once these trials are complete, and the ship is passed for operation of the F-35B, it will move to the next phase of fixed-wing flying trials, which will see Italy's own aircraft begin operating from the carrier. On 9 March 2021, USNS John Lenthall replenished her in the western Atlantic Ocean. Then on 20 March, she operated alongside USS Gerald R. Ford in the Atlantic Ocean. On 26 March, she was in Norfolk, Virginia when the F-35B trial was completed. She left Norfolk on 16 April and returned to homeport Taranto on 30 April.

Initial operating capability is expected for 2024.

In February 2022, she was part of interoperability training operations with the American carrier  and the French carrier  in the lead up to the Russian war of aggression against Ukraine.

See also
 List of naval ship classes in service
 
 Italian Naval Aviation

References

Sources

External links

Aircraft Carrier Cavour Marina Militare website

Aircraft carriers of the Italian Navy
2004 ships
Aircraft carriers of Italy
2010 Haiti earthquake relief
Ships built by Fincantieri